Kuskarwadi is a village in the Karmala taluka of Solapur district in Maharashtra state, India.

Demographics
Covering  and comprising 93 households at the time of the 2011 census of India, Kuskarwadi had a population of 333. There were 175 males and 158 females, with 15 people being aged six or younger.

References

Villages in Karmala taluka